Anthonie Andriessen (1747–1813) was a Dutch artist. He worked with his brother  Jurriaan to paint wallpapers for private houses.

References

1746 births
1813 deaths
Painters from Amsterdam
18th-century Dutch painters
18th-century Dutch male artists
Dutch male painters
19th-century Dutch painters
19th-century Dutch male artists